Porzecze may refer to the following places:
Porzecze, Pomeranian Voivodeship (north Poland)
Porzecze, Świętokrzyskie Voivodeship (south-central Poland)
Porzecze, Myślibórz County in West Pomeranian Voivodeship (north-west Poland)
Porzecze, Sławno County in West Pomeranian Voivodeship (north-west Poland)
Porechye (Parečča in Belarusian), a village in Grodno Voblast (north-west Belarus)